Grand Canyon West Airport  is a public airport  northwest of Peach Springs, in Mohave County, Arizona, United States. It is owned and operated by the Hualapai tribe and is on the Hualapai Indian Reservation.

Federal Aviation Administration records say the airport had 137,771 commercial passenger boardings (enplanements) in calendar year 2017. The FAA's National Plan of Integrated Airport Systems for 2007–2011 classified it as commercial service - primary because it has over 10,000 passenger boardings per year.

Passengers can fly from Las Vegas or drive (120 miles from Las Vegas) which includes newly paved road that was previously a rough stretch of dirt road.

Plane, helicopter and bus tours are offered. The bus tours stop at Hualapai Ranch, Eagle Point and Guano Point. 

Eagle Point is home to the Grand Canyon Skywalk.

Facilities
It has one runway: 

In the year ending June 30, 2006 the airport had 130,300 aircraft operations, average 357 per day: 63% air taxi, 37% airline and <1% general aviation.

Airline and destination

References

External links

 Grand Canyon West, official website
 Grand Canyon West Airport (1G4) at Arizona DOT airport directory
 

Airports in Mohave County, Arizona
Native American airports
Grand Canyon, South Rim (west)